Ficelle picarde ("Picardy string") is a dish of Picardy, northern France, consisting of a rolled savoury crêpe stuffed with a slice of ham and a creamed shallots duxelles, broiled in cream under a layer of cheese. 

Though now considered a classic Picardy dish, its origins appear based in Amiens' in ″l'hôtel du Commerce″ where a chef developed it in 1950, notwithstanding some legends stating the dish originated in the era of Louis XIV.

See also
 List of pancakes

References

Picardy cuisine
Pancakes
Ham dishes
Cheese dishes
Mushroom dishes
Stuffed dishes